Hard to Kill is a 1990 American action film starring Steven Seagal.

Hard to Kill may also refer to:

Film, TV, and events
 Hard to Kill, a 2018 Discovery Channel show hosted by Tim Kennedy
 Dynamite (1949 film), an American drama originally called Hard To Kill
 Impact Wrestling Hard To Kill, an annual professional wrestling event
 Hard To Kill (2020), the first event
 Hard To Kill (2021), the second event
 Hard To Kill (2022), the third event
 Easy Money II: Hard to Kill, a 2012 Swedish thriller film

Music

Albums
 Hard to Kill (Gucci Mane album), a 2006 album by American rapper Gucci Mane
 Hard to Kill, a 2007 album by Australian hip hop artist Vents
 Hard to Kill, a 2014 album by American blues musician Lynwood Slim
 Hard To Kill (Raging Speedhorn album), a 2020 album by British heavy metal band Raging Speedhorn

Songs
 "Hard To Kill", a song on the 1992 album Runaway Slave by American hip hop duo Showbiz and A.G.
 "Hard to Kill", a 2007 single by American rapper Uncle Murda
 "Hard to Kill", a song on the 2010 album Return of the Devil's Son by American rapper Big 
 "Hard to Kill", a 2019 single on the album Don't You Think You've Had Enough? by American punk rock band Bleached

See also 
 Hard Kill, a 2020 American action film